Seven arts may refer to:
The traditional subdivision of the arts, being Architecture, Sculpture, Painting, Literature,  Music, Performing, and Film
The Seven Liberal Arts, being grammar, logic, rhetoric, arithmetic, geometry, music, and astronomy
The Seven Arts, an artistic magazine
Seven Arts Productions, a movie production company
Seven Arts, an early 1990s defunct joint venture releasing company between Carolco Pictures and New Line Cinema
Seven Arts Pictures, a UK independent film production company
Seven Arts Shop, a Tudor Storybook retail shop in Carmel-by-the-Sea, California
Seven Arts Building, a cement-block framed commercial building in Carmel-by-the-Sea, California

See also
Seven Lively Arts (disambiguation)